La Cochette (or Pointe de la Cochette) is a mountain of the Chartreuse Mountains culminating at 1618 m above sea level  and located at the edge of Corbel, of Saint-Jean-de-Couz and of Entremont-le-Vieux in Savoie.

Geography 
La Cochette is part of the Mount Outheran Range. The link extends to the south by its south antecime, the tip of the Grand Crêt, and ends at the Pointe de Thivelet.

The rocky crest of La Cochette is formed by limestones of Fontanil

Access 
Access to the tip of the Cochette passes through the col du Grapillon.

Environmental protection 
La Cochette is part of the Regional Natural Park of Chartreuse and the natural area of ecological, faunistic and floristic interest type II of the Chartreuse massif.

References 

Mountains of the Alps
Mountains of Savoie
Chartreuse Mountains